Palpa 2 one of two parliamentary constituencies of Palpa District in Nepal. This constituency came into existence on the Constituency Delimitation Commission (CDC) report submitted on 31 August 2017.

Incorporated areas 
Palpa 2 incorporates Rainadevi Chhahara Rural Municipality, Ribdikot Rural Municipality, Bangnaskali Rural Municipality, ward 1 of Mathagadhi Rural Municipality, ward 1–4 and 6 of Tinau Rural Municipality and wards 1–7 and 9–14 of Tansen Municipality.

Assembly segments 
It encompasses the following Lumbini Provincial Assembly segment

 Palpa 2(A)
 Palpa 2(B)

Members of Parliament

Parliament/Constituent Assembly

Provincial Assembly

2(A)

2(B)

Election results

Election in the 2020s

2022 general election

Election in the 2010s

2017 legislative elections

2017 Nepalese provincial elections

2(A)

2(B)

2013 Constituent Assembly election

Election in the 2000s

2008 Constituent Assembly election

Election in the 1990s

1999 legislative elections

1994 legislative elections

1991 legislative elections

See also 

 List of parliamentary constituencies of Nepal

References

External links 

 Constituency map of Palpa

Parliamentary constituencies of Nepal